Wade is an unincorporated community in Bryan County, Oklahoma, United States. Wade had a post office from October 24, 1890, to November 30, 1971. The community was named for Choctaw Alfred Wade.

References

Unincorporated communities in Bryan County, Oklahoma
Unincorporated communities in Oklahoma